The 2009 Metro Atlantic Athletic Conference baseball tournament took place from May 21 through 23, 2009. The top four regular season finishers of the league's teams met in the double-elimination tournament held at Mercer County Waterfront Park in Trenton, New Jersey.  won their fifth tournament championship and earned the conference's automatic bid to the 2009 NCAA Division I baseball tournament.

Seeding 
The top four teams were seeded one through four based on their conference winning percentage. They then played a double-elimination tournament.

Results

All-Tournament Team 
The following players were named to the All-Tournament Team.

Most Valuable Player 
Jacob Wiley was named Tournament Most Valuable Player. Wiley was a pitcher for Marist, and recorded three saves in the Tournament.

References 

Tournament
Metro Atlantic Athletic Conference Baseball Tournament
Metro Atlantic Athletic Conference baseball tournament